SO4 may refer to:
 National Identification Service, a department of the London Metropolitan Police which provides a range of support services on behalf of the Metropolitan Police and other police forces
 Star Ocean: The Last Hope, an action role-playing video game developed by Tri-Ace and Square Enix
 Sulfate, in chemistry, an inorganic ion or a salt of sulfuric acid. 
 SO4 is an acronym for remembering the function of the fourth cranial nerve, the trochlear nerve, which control the superior oblique muscle of the eye. 
 SO(4), the group of rotations in 4-dimensional Euclidean space